Millwood is an unincorporated community in Douglas County, Oregon, United States. W.B. Clarke, a sawmill builder, named the community, and was the first postmaster of its post office, which operated from June 7, 1886 to July 31, 1931.

References

Unincorporated communities in Douglas County, Oregon
1886 establishments in Oregon
Populated places established in 1886
Unincorporated communities in Oregon